The Crimson Circle is a 1922 British silent crime film directed by George Ridgwell and starring Clifton Boyne, Fred Groves and Robert English. The film was an adaptation of the 1922 novel The Crimson Circle by Edgar Wallace.

A German-British version of novel, The Crimson Circle (1929), was filmed in both a silent and Phonofilm sound-on-film version.

Plot
Police battle against a gang of blackmailers known as The Crimson Circle.

Selected cast
 Clifton Boyne as Derrick Yale 
 Fred Groves as Inspector Parr  
 Robert English as Felix Marl  
 Lawford Davidson as Raphael Willings 
 Rex Davis as Jack Beardmore 
 Sidney Paxton as Harvey Froyant 
 Harry J. Worth as Superintendent
 Eva Moore as Aunt Prudence 
 Norma Whalley as Kitty Froyant 
 Madge Stuart as Thalia Drummond
 Mary Odette

References

External links

The Crimson Circle (1922) at SilentEra

1922 films
1922 crime films
Films directed by George Ridgwell
Films based on British novels
Films based on works by Edgar Wallace
British silent feature films
Films set in London
British black-and-white films
British crime films
1920s English-language films
1920s British films